Peter Oxley was the bass player for 1980s Australian pop-rock band The Sunnyboys.

He is credited with writing two songs with The Sunnyboys: "The Stooge" (from the 1984 album Get Some Fun) and "You Don't Need Me" (from the 1983 album Individuals). He also co-wrote "Let You Go", from the group's 1981 self-titled debut album with his brother Jeremy.

The older brother of Sunnyboys front man Jeremy Oxley, Peter later teamed with their sister Melanie Oxley in her band The Sparklers. Peter lives in Newtown, Sydney, working at the gourmet pizza restaurant he owns and manages.

In 2017, Peter joined Ed Kuepper's revival of The Aints! for a series of shows playing material from Kuepper's earlier band, The Saints.  Following the tour, the band recorded an album of songs originally written around the time of The Saints, and followed this with another tour in late 2018.

Discography

Albums with (The Sunnyboys : 1980–84, 92 & 98)
 The Sunnyboys''' - Mushroom (1981)
 Individuals - Mushroom (May 1982)
 Get Some Fun - Mushroom (1984)
 Real Live Sunnyboys - Mushroom (1984)
 Days Are Gone - Closer (1984)
 Plays The Best - Mushroom Records (July 1991)
 Shakin: Live August 1991 - Phantom Records (1992)
 This Is Real: Singles/Live/Rare - Feel Presents/Shock Records (20 September 2004)

Albums with (The Sparklers : 1985-1989)
 Persuasion - Mighty Boy (October 1988)

 Albums with (The Aints! : 2017-2018)
 The Church of Simultaneous Existence'' - ABC Music (2018)

References

Living people
Australian bass guitarists
Year of birth missing (living people)